William Smith (died 1591), of Wells, Somerset, was an English politician.

He was a Member (MP) of the Parliament of England for Wells in 1586.

References

Year of birth missing
1591 deaths
English MPs 1586–1587
People from Wells, Somerset